William Frederick "Whitey" Wietelmann (March 15, 1919 – March 26, 2002) was an American professional baseball player, coach and manager. He was an infielder in the Major Leagues from –47 for the Boston Braves and Pittsburgh Pirates. He was a switch-hitter who threw right-handed.

Wietelmann's playing career lasted for two decades, from 1937 to 1956. He broke in with the Braves in September 1939 when they were still nicknamed the "Bees", a temporary name change for the franchise begun in 1936 and abandoned after the 1940 season.  He was the Braves' regular shortstop during the wartime –44 seasons, and their regular second baseman during the final wartime season, when he hit a career-high .271.  In September 1946, he was sent to the Pirates in one of the most important trades in Boston Braves history. In the multi-player transaction, Boston acquired third baseman Bob Elliott, who would win the  National League Most Valuable Player Award and lead Boston to the  NL championship.

After one season with Pittsburgh, Wietelmann was sent to the minor leagues.  During his nine-season big league career, he collected 409 hits in 580 games played, with 55 doubles, six triples and seven home runs.

He was also an MLB coach for the Cincinnati Reds (1966–67) and San Diego Padres (1969–79) for 13 seasons, after ten seasons as a minor league coach in the Pacific Coast League, including nine years of service with the PCL Padres.

Whitey Wietelmann died in San Diego at the age of 83.

External links
, or Retrosheet, or The Deadball Era

1919 births
2002 deaths
Baseball players from Ohio
Baseball players from San Diego
Beaver Falls Bees players
Boston Bees players
Boston Braves players
Cincinnati Reds coaches
Evansville Bees players
Hartford Bees players
Lincoln Chiefs players
Louisville Colonels (minor league) players
Major League Baseball bullpen coaches
Major League Baseball infielders
Minor league baseball coaches
Minor league baseball managers
Pittsburgh Pirates players
Sacramento Solons players
San Diego Padres coaches
San Diego Padres (minor league) players
Sportspeople from Zanesville, Ohio
Wichita Falls Spudders players
Yuma Sun Sox players